Pretty...Slow is an album by the American indie rock band Fuck, and their first to see wide release. It was released by their own label, Rhesus Records, in 1996, and contains new material as well as songs originally released on their first album, the cassette Fuck. 

Pretty...Slow was reissued by Smells Like Records in 2016.

Production
The album was recorded at Black Eyed Pig Recording Studio, in San Francisco. It was originally released in a limited edition cardboard packaging, with a coloring book and games.

Critical reception

AllMusic wrote that "most of the tracks are off-kilter ballads played on dimly recorded acoustic guitars or clicking electrics with bass and light percussion."

Track listing
 Wrongy Wrong
 I Am Your King
 Hide Face
 In the Corner
 From Heaven
 One Eye out the Door
 Monkey Does His Thing
 Pretty Pretty
 Shotgun (H)ours

References

Fuck (band) albums
1996 albums